Northline is an unincorporated community located in the town of Hudson, St. Croix County, Wisconsin, United States.

History
Northline was originally called North Wisconsin Junction, until 1906 when the present name was adopted. A post office called North Wisconsin Junction was in operation from 1878 until 1884. Northline was named from the fact that from this point a branch of the railroad headed for Northern Wisconsin.

Notes

Unincorporated communities in St. Croix County, Wisconsin
Unincorporated communities in Wisconsin